Mikhail Aleksandrovich Stroganov (born 4 December 1968) is a former Russian football player.

References

1968 births
Living people
Soviet footballers
FC FShM Torpedo Moscow players
FC Asmaral Moscow players
FC Okean Nakhodka players
Russian footballers
Russian Premier League players
FC Arsenal Tula players
FC Khimik-Arsenal players
FC Lada-Tolyatti players
FC Yugra Nizhnevartovsk players

Association football defenders